Proposed bills are often categorized into public bills and private bills. A public bill is a proposed law which would apply to everyone within its jurisdiction. This is unlike a private bill which is a proposal for a law affecting only a single person, group, or area, such as a bill granting a named person citizenship or, previously, granting named persons a legislative divorce. After a bill is enacted, these bills become public acts and private acts, respectively.

Private law can afford relief from another law, grant a unique benefit or powers not available under the general law, or relieve someone from legal responsibility for some allegedly wrongful act. There are many examples of such private law in democratic countries, although its use has changed over time. A private bill is not to be confused with a private member's bill, which is a bill introduced by a "private member" of the legislature rather than by the ministry.

In practice, a (technically) public act can have the effect of a private act by the addition of restrictions such as limiting the act's effect to areas falling within a certain population bracket.

United Kingdom

Public bills are the most common bills introduced in the Parliament of the United Kingdom. If they are enacted, they become Public General Acts (in contrast with Local and Personal Acts).

There are two types of private Act in the United Kingdom. The first are acts for the benefit of individuals (known as private or personal acts) which have historically often dealt with divorces or granting British nationality to foreigners, but in modern times are generally limited to authorising marriages which would otherwise not be legal.

The second type are Acts for the benefit of organisations, or authorising major projects such as railways or canals, or granting extra powers to local authorities (known as local acts).

There is another classification known as a hybrid instrument which shares characteristics of both public and private bills.

United States

Public bills are the most common type of law in the United States.

In the United States, private bills were previously common. However, federal agencies are now able to deal with most of the issues that were previously dealt with under private bills as these agencies have been granted sufficient discretion by the United States Congress to deal with exceptions to the general legislative scheme of various laws. The kinds of private bills that are still introduced include grants of citizenship to individuals who are otherwise ineligible for normal visa processing; alleviation of tax liabilities; armed services decorations; and veteran benefits.

See also
 Private member's bill 
 List of beneficiaries of immigration/nationality-related United States Private Bills/Laws

References

External links
 List of recent beneficiaries of immigration-related private bills
 Canada: Table of Private Acts (1867 to December 31, 2013)

 
 
 
Statutory law
Bill